Aphrodite, in comics, may refer to:

 Aphrodite (DC Comics), a DC Comics character connected to Wonder Woman
 Aphrodite (Marvel Comics), the goddess as depicted in Marvel Comics (also known as Venus) 
 Aphrodite (Xena and Hercules), a character who has appeared in the Xena comic books
 Aphrodite IX, a 2000 series from the Image Comics imprint Top Cow
 Pisces Aphrodite, a character from the manga Saint Seiya
 Aphrodite, a character who appeared in the comic book Athena from Dynamite Entertainment

See also
Aphrodite (disambiguation)
Venus (comics), the Roman name for the same (or similar) deity